The New Croatian Initiative ( or NHI) was a Croatian political party in Bosnia and Herzegovina. It was founded by Krešimir Zubak in 1998 after he left the Croatian Democratic Union of Bosnia and Herzegovina. The party consisted  mainly of liberals, the majority of whom were dissidents from the Croatian Democratic Union of Bosnia and Herzegovina. Zubak believed that its leaders didn't care about the interests of Croats in Central Bosnia. The party was merged into the Croatian Peasant Party of Bosnia and Herzegovina in 2007 under the leadership of Marco Tadić.

References

Croat political parties in Bosnia and Herzegovina
Defunct political parties in Bosnia and Herzegovina